The 1934 Kansas gubernatorial election was held on November 6, 1934. Incumbent Republican Alf Landon defeated Democratic nominee Omar B. Ketchum with 53.51% of the vote.

Primary elections
Primary elections were held on August 7, 1934.

Democratic primary

Candidates 
Omar B. Ketchum, Mayor of Topeka
Thurman Hill
Charles E. Miller
Kirk Prather
George E. Rogers
Walter Eggers

Results

Republican primary

Candidates
Alf Landon, incumbent Governor
John R. Brinkley, businessman

Results

General election

Candidates
Major party candidates 
Alf Landon, Republican
Omar B. Ketchum, Democratic

Other candidates
George M. Whiteside, Socialist

Results

References

1934
Kansas
Gubernatorial